The Nicklin Ministry was a ministry of the Government of Queensland and was led by Country Party Premier Frank Nicklin. It succeeded the Gair Ministry on 12 August 1957 following the defeat of both Labor and the QLP at the state election held nine days earlier. It was succeeded by the Pizzey Ministry on 17 January 1968 when Nicklin retired from politics.

First ministry
On 12 August 1957, the Administrator designated 11 principal executive offices of the Government and appointed the following Members of the Legislative Assembly of Queensland to the Ministry as follows.

The list below is ordered by decreasing seniority within the Cabinet, as indicated by the Government Gazette and the Hansard index. Blue entries indicate members of the Liberal Party.

Second ministry
On 9 June 1960, following the 1960 state election, the Ministry was reconstituted. Adolf Muller and James Heading left the ministry, to be replaced by Lloyd Roberts and Alan Fletcher.

Third ministry
On 26 September 1963, following the introduction of a bill to increase the ministry from 11 to 13 members, the Ministry was reconstituted with two new ministers, Joh Bjelke-Petersen (Country) and Peter Delamothe (Liberal).

References
 
 

Queensland ministries